Herbert James Matthews (28 February 1883 – 3 September 1972) was a Co-operative Commonwealth Federation member of the House of Commons of Canada. He was born in Spondon, Derbyshire, England, and became a Christian minister by career.

He was first elected to Parliament at the Kootenay East riding in the 1945 general election after an unsuccessful attempt there in 1940. He was defeated in the 1949 election by James Allen Byrne of the Liberal party.

References

External links
 

1883 births
1972 deaths
Members of the House of Commons of Canada from British Columbia
Co-operative Commonwealth Federation MPs
20th-century Canadian politicians
Canadian clergy
People from Spondon